Habibullah Sirajee (31 December 1948 – 24 May 2021) was a Bangladeshi poet. He was awarded Ekushey Padak in 2016 by the Government of Bangladesh for his contribution to language and literature. He served as the Director General of Bangla Academy from 20 December 2018 until his death. Sirajee also served as the President of Jatiya Kabita Parishad (National Poetry Council).

Early life and education
Sirajee was born on 31 December 1948 at Rasulpur in Faridpur. He had graduated in BSc. (Engineering) from Bangladesh University of Engineering and Technology in 1970.

Awards
 Jessore Sahitya Parishad Award (1987)
 Alaol Literary Award (1989)
 Bangla Academy Literary Award (1991)
 Bishinu Dey Award (2007)
 Rupashi Bangla Award (2010)
 Kabitalap Literary Award (2010)
 Mahadiganta Award (2011)
 Bangabandhu Award (2013)
 Poet Fazal Shahabuddin Poetry Award (2016)
 Ekushey Padak (2016)

References

1948 births
2021 deaths
People from Faridpur District
Bangladeshi male poets
Recipients of Bangla Academy Award
Recipients of the Ekushey Padak
Bangladesh University of Engineering and Technology alumni